John Holman was an English slave trader from London who settled in the Pongo River area in the 1760s before eventually moving on to South Carolina in 1790.

References

English slave traders
Businesspeople from London
18th-century English businesspeople